Vernon Oswald Marquez or V. O. Marquez (born in Trinidad) was president of the Northern Electric Company (now Nortel) from 1967 - 1971.

References

External links
 Innovation and Business Strategy: Why Canada Falls Short

Canadian businesspeople
Nortel people